Mount Tondano in the province of North Sulawesi, Sulawesi, Indonesia, has a 20 × 30 km wide caldera which was formed in the Late Miocene or Early Pliocene by a massive eruption. Post caldera activity includes pyroclastic cones, obsidian flows and geothermal areas in the caldera area. Lake Tondano lies in the east side of the caldera.

The 5 km long and 3.5 km wide ellipsoidal Pangolombian caldera lies entirely within the Tondano Caldera, and formed from a large eruption of an older Somma volcano.

In more recent times, the somma volcanoes of Soputan, Sempu, Lokon-Empung and Mahawu have been constructed along the rim of the Tondano caldera, with Soputan being the youngest and most frequently active of the group. The Tondano caldera has been investigated as a potential source for geothermal energy to support the growing population in the vicinity of the caldera. Energy demand has been growing in Indonesia, and the Tondano caldera system could potentially provide clean energy for thousands of residents in northern Sulawesi.

See also 

 List of volcanoes in Indonesia

References 

Mountains of Sulawesi
Volcanoes of Sulawesi
Calderas of Indonesia
Volcanic crater lakes
Landforms of North Sulawesi